Parsons Agliam Nabiula Jr. (August 22, 1958 – May 10, 2020), known professionally as Sonny Parsons, was a Filipino actor, singer, director and politician in the Philippines. He was a member of Hagibis, an all-male sing-and-dance group in the late 1970s to the early 1980s, who were coined as the Filipino version of the Village People. He was a councilor in Marikina City, Metro Manila. He died on May 10, 2020 from a heart attack caused by heat stroke.

Singing career
In the late 1970s to 1980s, Parsons was a member of the Manila sound group Hagibis together with Bernie Fineza, Mike Respall, Joji Garcia and Mon Picazo. Their hit songs included "Legs", "Babae", "Lalake" and "Katawan" (a theme song in Palibhasa Lalake, a Philippine TV sitcom series), among others. In 2001, Hagibis reunited and released one album under Star Records. He performed in a series of concerts at various venues such as in Hobbit House (Ermita), Hobbit East (Antipolo), Bodega City (Quezon Ave) and Cowboy Grill (Malate), among others. In 2011, he was a special guest in the Philippines leg of the greatest hits tour of Bobby Kimball (original lead singer of Toto).

Acting career
In 1981, the Hagibis members made a film titled Legs Katawan Babae with Laarni Enriquez, Myrna Castillo and Jess Lapid, Jr., and directed by Tony Ferrer. When Hagibis split up in the 1980s, Parsons became an actor, director, and politician. He appeared in many action films in the late 1980s and early 1990s. He starred with Ronnie Ricketts in the 1989 action film UZI Brother 9mm which was directed by Francis 'Jun' Posadas. His first TV guest appearance was in the 1991 teleserye Agila which starred Val Sotto, Aurora Sevilla and Roy Alvarez. He produced, directed, and starred in the film Bala Para sa Katarungan for Regal Films in 1997. Parsons played a guest role as the main villain to Coco Martin in the 2017 action-drama TV series FPJ's Ang Probinsyano.

Personal life
Parsons was the founder and president of the Allied Forces of the Philippines Civilian Volunteers (AFPCIV), a Non-Governmental Organization (NGO) whose mission is focused on humanitarian response and anti-crime operations throughout the Philippines. In a robbery incident, he pursued and killed 2 of the robbery suspects.

Parsons was an advocate of responsible gun ownership and shared his expertise in tactical and defensive shooting.  In his last years, he served as a consultant in the National Bureau of Investigations.

Parsons was also an active member of the Law Enforcers Riders Association of the Philippines.

Death
Parsons died on May 10, 2020 due to heart attack caused by heat stroke in Tayabas City, Quezon Province.

Filmography

Film

Television

References

External links

1950 births
2020 deaths
Filipino actor-politicians
Filipino male film actors
Male actors from Metro Manila
Manila sound musicians
Metro Manila city and municipal councilors
People from Marikina
Singers from Metro Manila